is a railway station on the Jōetsu Line in Uonuma, Niigata, Japan, operated by the East Japan Railway Company (JR East).

Lines

Station layout
The station has two opposed ground-level side platforms serving three tracks, connected by a footbridge. The station has a Midori no Madoguchi staffed ticket office.

Platforms

History
Echigo-Horinouchi Station opened on 1 August 1922. Upon the privatization of the Japanese National Railways (JNR) on 1 April 1987, it came under the control of JR East.

Passenger statistics
In fiscal 2015, the station was used by an average of 433 passengers daily (boarding passengers only).

Surrounding area
former Horinouchi town hall
Japan National Route 17
Horinouchi Post Office
Horinouchi Elementary School
Horinouchi Middle School

See also
 List of railway stations in Japan

References

External links

 Echigo-Horinouchi Station information (JR East) 

Railway stations in Niigata Prefecture
Railway stations in Japan opened in 1922
Stations of East Japan Railway Company
Jōetsu Line